Nebeska Suza is a tiny lake at the Golija mountain in Serbia at the elevation of 1495 metres near Okruglica.

History 
Nebeska Suza lake was unearthed following an earthquake in bordering Romania.

References

Lakes of Serbia